"Cold Cold Cold" is a song by American alternative rock band Cage the Elephant. It was produced and co-written by Dan Auerbach of the Black Keys and was released as the third single from the band's fourth studio album Tell Me I'm Pretty on January 17, 2017. It reached number five on Billboard Alternative Songs chart in the United States.

Use in other media 
"Cold Cold Cold" was used on the premiere episode of the fourth season of ABC television series How to Get Away with Murder.

Charts
The song was a hit on the Billboard Alternative Songs chart, peaking at number five and staying on the chart for a total of 21 weeks. It was also a hit on the Adult Alternative Songs chart, peaking at four and charting for 28 weeks. The song also charted on several other charts, mainly charting in North America.

Weekly charts

Year-end charts

Certifications

Release history

References

2015 songs
2017 singles
Cage the Elephant songs
RCA Records singles
Song recordings produced by Dan Auerbach
Songs written by Matt Shultz (singer)
Songs written by Dan Auerbach